Chedi is an alternative term for a Buddhist stupa, mainly used in Thailand. It may also refer to:

 Chedi Kingdom, an early kingdom in India
 Chedi, U Thong, a subdistrict of U Thong District, Suphan Buri Province, Thailand